Written by the Dutch philosopher Benedictus Spinoza, the Tractatus Theologico-Politicus (TTP) or Theologico-Political Treatise was one of the most controversial texts of the early modern period. In it, Spinoza expounds his views on contemporary Jewish and Christian religion and critically analyses the Bible which underlies both. He argues what the best roles for state and religion should be and concludes that a degree of democracy and freedom of speech and religion works best, like in Amsterdam, while the state remains paramount within reason. The goal of the state is to guarantee the freedom of the citizens. Religious leaders should not meddle in politics. Spinoza prepares the ground for his work on metaphysics and psychology, Ethics, published posthumously in 1677, for which he anticipated harsh criticism.

Historical context

Publication history
The treatise was published anonymously in 1670 by Jan Rieuwertsz in Amsterdam. In order to protect the author and publisher from political retribution, the title page identified the city of publication as Hamburg and the publisher as Henricus Künraht. It was written in New Latin rather than the vernacular Dutch in an attempt to avoid censorship by the secular Dutch authorities.

Treatment of religion
In the treatise, Spinoza put forth his most systematic critique of Judaism, and all organized religion in general. Spinoza argued that theology and philosophy must be kept separate, particularly in the reading of scripture. Whereas the goal of theology is obedience, philosophy aims at understanding rational truth. Scripture does not teach philosophy and thus cannot be made to conform with it, otherwise the meaning of scripture will be distorted. Conversely, if reason is made subservient to scripture, then, Spinoza argues, "the prejudices of a common people of long ago... will gain a hold on his understanding and darken it."

Spinoza argued that purportedly supernatural occurrences, namely prophecy and miracles, have in fact natural explanations. He argued that God acts solely by the laws of his own nature and rejected the view that God acts for a particular purpose or telos. For Spinoza, those who believe that God acts for some end are delusional and projecting their hopes and fears onto the workings of nature.

Scriptural interpretation
Spinoza was not only the real father of modern metaphysics and moral and political philosophy, but also of the so-called higher criticism of the Bible. He was particularly attuned to the idea of interpretation; he felt that all organized religion was simply the institutionalized defense of particular interpretations. He rejected in its entirety the view that Moses composed the first five books of the Bible, called the Pentateuch by Christians or Torah by Jews. He provided an analysis of the structure of the Bible which demonstrated that it was essentially a compiled text with many different authors and diverse origins; in his view, it was not "revealed" all at once.

His Tractatus Theologico-Politicus undertook to show that Scriptures properly understood gave no authority for the militant intolerance of the clergy who sought to stifle all dissent by the use of force. To achieve his object, Spinoza had to show what is meant by a proper understanding of the Bible, which gave him occasion to apply criticism to the Bible. His approach stood in stark contrast to contemporaries like John Bunyan, Manasseh ben Israel, and militant clerics. Spinoza, who permitted no supernatural rival to Nature and no rival authority to the civil government of the state, rejected also all claims that Biblical literature should be treated in a manner entirely different from that in which any other document is treated that claims to be historical. His contention that the Bible "is in parts imperfect, corrupt, erroneous, and inconsistent with itself, and that we possess but fragments of it" roused great storm at the time, and was mainly responsible for his evil repute for a century at least. Nevertheless, many have gradually adopted his views, agreeing with him that the real "word of God", or true religion, is not something written in books but "inscribed on the heart and mind of man". Many scholars and ministers of religion now praise Spinoza's services in the correct interpretation of Scripture as a document of first rate importance in the progressive development of human thought and conduct.

Treatment of Judaism
Though of Jewish ancestry, Spinoza does not refer to himself as Jewish at all through the treatise. He only speaks of "the Hebrews" or "the Jews" in third person. 
The treatise also rejected the Jewish notion of "chosenness"; to Spinoza, all peoples are on par with each other, as God has not elevated one over the other. Spinoza also offered a sociological explanation as to how the Jewish people had managed to survive for so long, despite facing relentless persecution. In his view, the Jews had been preserved due to a combination of Gentile hatred and Jewish separatism.

He also gave one final, crucial reason for the continued Jewish presence, which in his view, was by itself sufficient to maintain the survival of the nation forever: circumcision. It was the ultimate anthropological expression of bodily marking, a tangible symbol of separateness which was the ultimate identifier.

Spinoza also posited a novel view of the Torah; he claimed that it was essentially a political constitution of the ancient state of Israel. In his view, because the state no longer existed, its constitution could no longer be valid. He argued that the Torah was thus suited to a particular time and place; because times and circumstances had changed, the Torah could no longer be regarded as a valid document.

Spinoza's political theory
Spinoza agreed with Thomas Hobbes that if each man had to fend for himself, with nothing but his own right arm to rely upon, then the life of man would be "nasty, brutish, and short". The truly human life is only possible in an organised community, that is, a state or commonwealth. The state ensures security of life, limb and property; it brings within reach of every individual many necessaries of life which he could not produce by himself; and it sets free sufficient time and energy for the higher development of human powers. Now the existence of a state depends upon a kind of implicit agreement on the part of its members or citizens to obey the sovereign authority which governs it. In a state no one can be allowed to do just as he pleases. Every citizen is obliged to obey its laws; and he is not free even to interpret the laws in a special manner. This looks at first like a loss of freedom on the part of the individuals, and the establishment of an absolute power over them. Yet that is not really so. In the first place, without the advantages of an organised state the average individual would be so subject to dangers and hardships of all kinds and to his own passions that he could not be called free in any real sense of the term, least of all in the sense that Spinoza used it. Man needs the state not only to save him from others but also from his own lower impulses and to enable him to live a life of reason, which alone is truly human. In the second place, state sovereignty is never really absolute. It is true that almost any kind of government is better than none, so that it is worth bearing much that is irksome rather than disturb the peace. But a reasonably wise government will even in its own interest endeavour to secure the good will and cooperation of its citizens by refraining from unreasonable measures, and will permit or even encourage its citizens to advocate reforms, provided they employ peaceable means. In this way the state really rests, in the last resort, on the united will of the citizens, on what Jean-Jacques Rousseau, who read Spinoza, subsequently called the "general will".

Spinoza sometimes writes as if the state upheld absolute sovereignty. But that is due mainly to his determined opposition to every kind of ecclesiastical control over it. Though he is prepared to support what may be called a state religion, as a kind of spiritual cement, yet his account of this religion is such as to make it acceptable to the adherents of any one of the historic creeds, to deists, pantheists and all others, provided they are not fanatical believers or unbelievers. It is really in the interest of freedom of thought and speech that Spinoza would entrust the civil government with something approaching absolute sovereignty in order to effectively resist the tyranny of the militant churches.

Human power consists in strength of mind and intellect
One of the most striking features in Spinoza's political theory is his basic principle that "right is might." This principle he applied systematically to the whole problem of government, and seemed rather pleased with his achievement, inasmuch as it enabled him to treat political theory in a scientific spirit, as if he were dealing with applied mathematics. The identification or correlation of right with power has caused much misunderstanding. People supposed that Spinoza reduced justice to brute force. But Spinoza was very far from approving Realpolitik. In the philosophy of Spinoza the term "power" (as should be clear from his moral philosophy) means a great deal more than physical force. In a passage near the end of his Political Treatise he states explicitly that "human power chiefly consists in strength of mind and intellect" — it consists in fact, of all the human capacities and aptitudes, especially the highest of them. Conceived correctly, Spinoza's whole philosophy leaves ample scope for ideal motives in the life of the individual and of the community.

Monarchy, Aristocracy, and Democracy
Spinoza discusses the principal kinds of states, or the main types of government, namely, Monarchy, Aristocracy, and Democracy. Each has its own peculiarities and needs special safeguards, if it is to realise the primary function of a state. Monarchy may degenerate into Tyranny unless it is subjected to various constitutional checks which will prevent any attempt at autocracy. Similarly, Aristocracy may degenerate into Oligarchy and needs analogous checks. On the whole, Spinoza favours Democracy, by which he meant any kind of representative government. In the case of Democracy the community and the government are more nearly identical than in the case of Monarchy or Aristocracy; consequently a democracy is least likely to experience frequent collisions between the people and the government and so is best adapted to secure and maintain that peace, which it is the business of the state to secure.

Reception and influence
It is unlikely that Spinoza's Tractatus ever had political support of any kind, with attempts being made to suppress it even before Dutch magistrate Johan de Witt's murder in 1672. In 1673, it was publicly condemned by the Synod of Dordrecht (1673) and banned officially the following year. Harsh criticism of the TTP began to appear almost as soon as it was published. One of the first, and most notorious, critiques was by Leipzig professor Jakob Thomasius in 1670.
The British philosopher G. E. Moore suggested to Ludwig Wittgenstein that he title one of his works "Tractatus Logico-Philosophicus" as a homage to Spinoza's treatise.

See also
 Thomas Hobbes
 Moses Maimonides
 Abraham ibn Ezra
 Toleration
 Tractatus Politicus

Notes

References
 Israel, Jonathan I. Radical Enlightenment. Oxford University Press: 2001.

External links

 Spinoza and Two Views of God
 Theologico-Political Treatise (English translation by A. H. Gosset, Introduction by Robert Harvey Monro Elwes, 1883)
 Theologico-Political Treatise (English translation by Robert Harvey Monro Elwes)
 Tractatus Theologico-Politicus – Full text in Latin
 A Spinoza Chronology
 Benedict (Baruch) Spinoza – Internet Encyclopedia of Philosophy
 Contains a version of this work, slightly modified for easier reading
 Spinoza as a Prophet of Reason, a graduate-level research paper
 Note on the text and translation – Cambridge Books Online
 

1670 books
Anonymous works
Books critical of Christianity
Books critical of Judaism
Books critical of religion
Philosophy of religion literature
Political philosophy literature
Works by Baruch Spinoza
Treatises
Censored books